Guzal Darreh-ye Sofla (also Romanized as Gūzal Darreh-ye Soflá and Gowzal Darreh Soflā; also known as Gowzaldareh Pā’īn, Gowzaldareh Soflā, Gowzal Darreh, Gowzal Darreh-ye Pā’īn, Gozal Darreh, Gozal Darreh-ye Pā’īn, Gozaldarreh-ye Pā’īn, Gozaldarreh-ye Soflá, Qezel Darreh, and Qizil Darreh) is a village in Guzal Darreh Rural District of Bagh Helli District of Soltaniyeh County, Zanjan province, Iran.

At the 2006 National Census, its population was 1,604 in 489 households, when it was in Soltaniyeh District of Abhar County. The following census in 2011 counted 1,448 people in 484 households. The latest census in 2016 showed a population of 1,532 people in 542 households, by which time the village was in Bagh Helli District of the recently formed Soltaniyeh County; it was the largest village in its rural district.

References 

Soltaniyeh County

Populated places in Zanjan Province

Populated places in Soltaniyeh County